Birgit Skarstein (born 10 February 1989) is a Norwegian competitive rower and cross-country skier. She competed at the 2020 Summer Paralympics, in Women's single sculls, winning a gold medal.

Career 
In rowing at the 2016 Summer Paralympics, she finished fourth in the single sculls event. In cross-country skiing at the 2014 Winter Paralympics, Skarstein competed in the 1 km sprint classic, 5 km free, and 15 km free events. In cross-country skiing at the 2018 Winter Paralympics, she competed in the 1.5 km sprint classic, 7.5 km classic, and 15 km free events.

Skarstein won a gold medal in PR1W1x at the 2017 World Rowing Championships in Sarasota, ahead of Moran Samuel.

In 2019 she qualified to represent Norway at the 2020 Summer Paralympics held in Tokyo, Japan after winning the gold medal in the PR1 Women's single sculls event at the 2019 World Rowing Championships.

References

External links
 
 
 

1989 births
Living people
Norwegian female rowers
Norwegian female cross-country skiers
Paralympic rowers of Norway
Paralympic cross-country skiers of Norway
Paralympic medalists in rowing
Paralympic gold medalists for Norway
Rowers at the 2016 Summer Paralympics
Rowers at the 2020 Summer Paralympics
Medalists at the 2020 Summer Paralympics
Cross-country skiers at the 2014 Winter Paralympics
Cross-country skiers at the 2018 Winter Paralympics
World Rowing Championships medalists for Norway
Sportswomen with disabilities
People with paraplegia
People from Levanger
Sportspeople from Trøndelag
20th-century Norwegian women
21st-century Norwegian women